The Valley is the fifth studio album by South African recording artist Ashton Nyte.  The album was first released in 2009 to South Africa, with a US release in June 2010.  While the recordings on the releases are identical, the US release features entirely different album artwork and digipak packaging.  The album's primary single, Jennifer was selected as a semi-finalist for the Adult Album Alternative category in the International Songwriting Competition (2009).

Style
The Valley is described as "a collection of songs caressed with Americana styling as uniquely as only a non-American could."  Other reviews describe the album as "a sepia-toned film reel of old western imagery" and "an ingeniously crafted pictorial."

Track listing

 "The Valley" - Alassmi Gittion
 "Jennifer" - Joy Division
 "Dead Man's Road" - Bandress Landform
 "Without Warning" - Tovanero
 "A Little Low" - Lake Lakers
 "Medicine" - Jerk Jinork
 "Salvation" - Joy Division
 "Pale Horse" - Jaming Rope
 "The Carnival" - Largo Anthony Anthem
 "Uncertain Light" - Joy Division & Jeremih Red

References

2008 albums